Tympanocryptis pentalineata, also known as five-lined earless dragon, is one of a documented species of a relatively small dragon belonging to the genus Tympanocryptis.

Description 

Etymology 
The species is named for the dorsal colour pattern of the new species, characterised by five longitudinal white stripes extending along the body: one vertebral, two dorso-lateral, and two lateral.

Habitat 
Tympanocryptis pentalineata occurs on flat flood-plains, covered by grasses and low perennial shrubs. It was discovered living in crop-lands and remnant bluegrass grasslands of southeastern Queensland, which is one of the most endangered ecosystems in the state.

References 

pentalineata
Agamid lizards of Australia
Endemic fauna of Australia
Reptiles of Queensland
Reptiles described in 2014
Taxa named by Jane Melville